Alexandra ("Sandra") Johanna Le Poole (born 20 October 1959) is a retired field hockey player from the Netherlands. She was part of the Dutch hockey teams that won the 1984 Summer Olympics, world championships in 1978, 1979, 1983 and 1986, and European championships in 1984.

After retirement from competitions she worked as a coach and physiotherapist.

References

External links
 

1959 births
Living people
Dutch female field hockey players
Olympic field hockey players of the Netherlands
Field hockey players at the 1984 Summer Olympics
Dutch field hockey coaches
Olympic gold medalists for the Netherlands
Sportspeople from Leiden
Olympic medalists in field hockey
Female sports coaches
Medalists at the 1984 Summer Olympics
HGC players
Dutch physiotherapists
20th-century Dutch women
21st-century Dutch women